Swinburne Senior Secondary College is a co-educational government secondary college located at 505 Burwood Road Hawthorn Victoria which caters for Years 11 and 12 students. The College offers Victorian Certificate of Education (VCE), Vocational Education and Training (VET) and Victorian Certificate of Applied Learning (VCAL).

History
The college was founded in 1913. 

The current principal is Daryl Bennett, having commenced his appointment in July 2021.

Notable former students
 Marieke Hardy – writer, broadcaster, television producer and actress
 Georgia Maq – lead singer of Camp Cope
 Daniel Pollock – film actor, best known for his role as Davey in the 1992 Australian film Romper Stomper.

See also
 List of schools in Victoria
 Victorian Certificate of Education

References

External links
 Official Website

Public high schools in Melbourne
Educational institutions established in 1913
1913 establishments in Australia
Buildings and structures in the City of Boroondara